The 2004 Cardiff Council election was the third election to the post-1996 Cardiff Council following the re-organisation of local government in Wales. It was held on 10 June 2004. It was preceded by the 1999 election and followed by the 2008 elections. On the same day, elections were held for the European Parliament as well as to the other 21 local authorities and to community councils in Wales as part of the 2004 Welsh local elections.

Overview
Council elections in Wales were originally scheduled for May 2003, but were delayed to avoid a conflict with the 2003 Wales Assembly elections.

All 75 council seats were up for election. Labour lost its majority at this election. The Labour group leader also resigned after it became clear he would be defeated in an election for the post by Llandaff councillor Greg Owens.

Independent Butetown councillor, Betty Campbell, narrowly lost her seat to Labour amid claims of 'dirty tricks' during the campaign.

|}

Ward Results

Adamstown (2 seats)

Butetown (1 seat)

Caerau (2 seats)

Canton (3 seats)

Cathays (4 seats)

Creigiau & St. Fagans (1 seat)

Cyncoed (3 seats)

Ely (3 seats)

Fairwater (3 seats)

Gabalfa (2 seats)
The Liberal Democrats had won a seat in this ward at a by-election.

Grangetown (3 seats)

Heath (3 seats)

Lisvane (1 seat)

Llandaff (2 seats)

Llandaff North (2 seats)

Llanishen (4 seats)

Llanrumney (3 seats)

Pentwyn (4 seats)
Cubitt previously represented Pontprennau. Woodman had previously held the seat for the Liberal Democrats at a by-election on 11 September 2003.

Pentyrch (1 seat)

Penylan (3 seats)

Plasnewydd (4 seats)

Pontprennau & Old St. Mellons (2 seats)

Radyr (1 seat)

Rhiwbina (3 seats)

Riverside (3 seats)

Rumney (2 seats)

Splott (3 seats)

Trowbridge (3 seats)

Whitchurch & Tongwynlais (4 seats)

By-elections between 2004 and 2008
There were no by-elections.

References

2004
Cardiff
2000s in Cardiff